They Wanted to Marry is a 1937 romantic comedy film directed by Lew Landers from a screenplay by Paul Yawitz and Ethel Borden, based on a story by Larry Bachmann and Daniel L. Teilhet. RKO produced and distributed the film, releasing it on February 5, 1937. The picture stars Betty Furness and Gordon Jones.

Plot summary

Cast
 Gordon Jones as Jim
 Betty Furness as Sheila
 E.E. Clive as Stiles
 Patsy Parsons as Patsy (as Patsy Lee Parsons)
 Henry Kolker as Mr. Hunter
 Frank M. Thomas as Detective
 Charles C. Wilson as Clark (as Charles Wilson)
 William 'Billy' Benedict as Freckles (as William Benedict)
 Diana Gibson as Helen

References

External links
 
 
 
 

1937 romantic comedy films
American romantic comedy films
American black-and-white films
Films directed by Lew Landers
Films produced by Samuel J. Briskin
RKO Pictures films
1937 films
1930s American films